Tropomodulin (TMOD) is a protein which binds and caps the minus end of actin (the "pointed" end), regulating the length of actin filaments in muscle and non-muscle cells. 

The protein functions by physically blocking the spontaneous dissociation of ADP-bound actin monomers from the minus end of the actin fibre. This, along with plus end capping proteins, such as capZ stabilise the structure of the actin filament. End capping is particularly important when long-lived actin filaments are necessary, for example: in myofibrils. Inhibition of tropomodulin capping activity leads to dramatic increase in thin filament length from its pointed end.

Genes
TMOD1
TMOD2
TMOD3
TMOD4

References

External links